The 1977 All-Ireland Senior Camogie Championship was the high point of the 1977 season. The championship was won by Kilkenny who defeated Wexford by a seven-point margin in the final for a historic first success. The match drew an attendance of 4,000. It marked the first victory as captain for Angela Downey, arguably the greatest player in the history of camogie, who also scored 2-3 in the match.

Early Rounds
In the quarter-finals Wexford had a comfortable victory over Cork, Dublin defeated Antrim and 1974 junior champions Clare defeated 1976 junior champions Down (they led convincingly 5-2 to 0-3 at half time) to qualify for their first semi-final since 1944. A 20th-minute goal from Bernie Murphy meant Wexford took command of the semi-final, Clare trailed 3-1 to 0-1 at half time and their only rewards for a strong third quarter was a goal from Margaret O'Toole before Wexford finished with three more goals. Kilkenny beat Tipperary in the quarter-final and Angela Downey scored four of Kilkenny’s goals in their semi-final victory over Dublin at Parnell Park.

Final
Two first half goals gave Kilkenny the initiative which they never lost in the final. In the 17th minute Angela Downey's high cross from the left was touched on by Carmel Savage to Jo Dunne who availed of a defensive mistake to score. Angela came racing back to point and then sent a close free through the crowded goalmouth to the net to put Kilkenny two goals clear. Pádraig Puirséil wrote in the Irish Press:
Angela Downey was the outstanding player on the field, but she got plenty of help from the other forwards Carmel Savage, Jo Dunne and Mary Purcell. Though she started at left forward, Angela switched to the right for the entire second half. Kilkenny excelled yesterday not only in their strength in the really vital positions but in the all-round efficiency of the entire side. Wexford, with the north-easterly breeze behind them, looked by far the livelier side at the start but, though they more or less dominated the outfield exchanges through the opening 15 minutes, they made surprisingly little impression on a Kilkenny defence in which Liz Neary at full back and Mary Canavan soaked up so much pressure that goal-keeper Teresa O'Neill was rarely in trouble. The sisters Bridget Doyle and Kit Codd tried all they knew to turn the tide, as did the Walshs and Mairéad Darcy but, on the day, Wexford just had not what it took to recapture an All-Ireland title from a well-balanced Kilkenny side, which has now won the title three times in the past four seasons and thus joins Wexford on camogie's Roll of Honour.

Final stages

 
MATCH RULES
50 minutes
Replay if scores level
Maximum of 3 substitutions

See also
 All-Ireland Senior Hurling Championship
 Wikipedia List of Camogie players
 National Camogie League
 Camogie All Stars Awards
 Ashbourne Cup

References

External links
 Camogie Association
 All-Ireland Senior Camogie Championship: Roll of Honour
 * Historical reports of All Ireland finals 
 Camogie on facebook
 Camogie on GAA Oral History Project

All-Ireland Senior Camogie Championship
1977
All-Ireland Senior Camogie Championship
All-Ireland Senior Camogie Championship
All-Ireland Senior Camogie Championship
All-Ireland Senior Camogie Championship